Brantham Athletic Football Club is a football club based in Brantham, Suffolk, England.

History
The club was established in 1887 by workers from the British Xylonite factory under the name Brantham Works. Their first match was a 3–0 defeat to St Clements Institute from Ipswich on 28 January 1888. The club were founder members of the Ipswich & District League in 1896. However, despite finishing as runners-up in the first season, they left the league at its end. The club returned to Division Two of the league in 1898 and won the division at the first attempt. However, they withdrew midway through the following season. The club adopted the name Brantham Crown for some time and returned to Division One of the Ipswich & District League in 1905. In 1906 they reverted to their original name, and the following year left the Ipswich & District League again to join Division Two of the South East Anglian League. They returned to Division One of the Ipswich & District League for the 1908–09 season, but left again in 1910 to join the Harwich & District League. After playing in it for a single season they joined the Essex & Suffolk Border League, before switching back to Division Two of the Ipswich & District League in 1912, also playing in Division Two of the (now renamed) East Anglian League, winning both in 1913–14.

After World War I the club played in the Ipswich & District League from 1919 until 1925, the year in which they reached the final of the Suffolk Senior Cup, losing 1–0 to Kirkley. That year they also switched back to the Essex & Suffolk Border League. The club won the Senior Cup in 1927 with a 3–0 win over Lowestoft Town. After finishing bottom of the Essex & Suffolk Border League in 1931–32 they returned to the Ipswich & District League. After World War II they rejoined the Essex & Suffolk Border League, although they also played in the Ipswich & District League between 1947 and 1950. They won the Essex & Suffolk Border League League Cup in 1948–49, beating Colchester United 4–0 in the final. The club won the Senior Cup for a second time in 1959–60, defeating Christchurch Athletic 3–2. In 1972–73 they won the Essex & Suffolk Border League and retained the title the following season. In 1975–76 they won the league again, also winning the League Cup (with a 1–0 win against Wivenhoe Town after extra time) and the Senior Cup. A league and League Cup double was repeated the following season, with Brantham beating Wivenhoe 2–0 in the cup final.

The club applied to join the Eastern Counties League in 1977, but were rejected as the ECL secretary claimed that they wouldn't "attract people to watch them in other parts of the region". However, the following year they were successful and were admitted to the league. They achieved their highest-ever finish of fourth in 1982–83, the same season in which they reached the fifth round of the FA Vase, losing 1–0 at home to VS Rugby in front of a then-record crowd of 594. The following season they won the Suffolk Premier Cup, beating Lowestoft Town 2–0. When the league gained a second tier in 1988, the club was placed in the Premier Division. However, they were relegated to Division One in 1992–93 after finishing second from bottom.

Two years later they were relegated to the Suffolk & Ipswich League after finishing eighteenth out of 19 clubs. Suffering from financial problems, the club merged with SIL club Stutton to become Brantham & Stutton United. After winning the League Cup in 1997, the club reverted to its old name in 1998. They were relegated to Division One in 1999–2000, and despite making an immediate return to the Senior Division, they were relegated again the following season. They were promoted to the Senior Division after finishing second in 2004–05. They won the title in 2007–08, and were promoted back to the Eastern Counties League. After finishing third in 2009–10, the club were promoted to the Premier Division. They won the League Cup in 2017–18, defeating Thetford Town 4–2 in the final.

The club's Sunday league side played in the Ipswich Sunday League, and reached the FA Sunday Cup semi-final in 2008.

Honours
Eastern Counties League
League Cup winners 2017–18
Suffolk & Ipswich League
Champions 2007–08
League Cup winners 1996–97
Essex & Suffolk Border League
Champions 1972–73, 1973–74, 1975–76, 1976–77
League Cup winners 1948–49, 1975–76, 1976–77,
Suffolk Premier Cup
Winners 1983–84
Suffolk Senior Cup
Winners 1926–27, 1959–60, 1975–76

Records
Best FA Cup performance: Second qualifying round, 2018–19, 2020–21
Best FA Vase performance: Fifth round, 1982–83, 2012–13
Attendance: 1,700 vs VS Rugby, FA Vase fifth round, 1982–83

See also
Brantham Athletic F.C. players
Brantham Athletic F.C. managers

References

External links
Official website

 
Football clubs in England
Football clubs in Suffolk
Association football clubs established in 1887
1887 establishments in England
Suffolk and Ipswich Football League
Essex and Suffolk Border Football League
Eastern Counties Football League
Babergh District